Melinda Czink and Mirjana Lučić-Baroni were the defending champions, but both players chose not to compete.

Anna Tatishvili and Heather Watson won the tournament, defeating Sharon Fichman and Maria Sanchez in the final, 7–5, 5–7, [10–6].

Seeds

Draw

External Links
 Draw

Dow Corning Tennis Classic - Doubles
Dow Corning Tennis Classic